Gamochaeta pensylvanica, the Pennsylvania cudweed or Pennsylvania everlasting, is a widespread species of flowering plant in the family Asteraceae. It is native to South America and introduced into Eurasia, Africa, Australia, and North America. The pensylvanica epithet is a misnomer, as the plant is not native to Pennsylvania and only marginally naturalized there.

The plant forms many small flower heads in elongated arrays. Each head contains 3–4 purple disc flowers but no ray flowers.

Gallery

References

External links
photo of herbarium specimen collected in Guatemala
Lady Bird Johnson Wildflower Center, University of Texas

pensylvanica
Flora of South America
Plants described in 1788
Taxa named by Carl Ludwig Willdenow
Taxa named by Ángel Lulio Cabrera